The Khovrino Constituency (No.207) is a Russian legislative constituency in Moscow. It is based in Northern Moscow as well as Zelenograd.

Members elected

Election results

1993

|-
! colspan=2 style="background-color:#E9E9E9;text-align:left;vertical-align:top;" |Candidate
! style="background-color:#E9E9E9;text-align:left;vertical-align:top;" |Party
! style="background-color:#E9E9E9;text-align:right;" |Votes
! style="background-color:#E9E9E9;text-align:right;" |%
|-
|style="background-color:#0085BE"|
|align=left|Andrey Makarov
|align=left|Choice of Russia
|59,986
|27.66%
|-
|style="background-color:"|
|align=left|Tatyana Bulgakova
|align=left|Liberal Democratic Party
| -
|8.51%
|-
| colspan="5" style="background-color:#E9E9E9;"|
|- style="font-weight:bold"
| colspan="3" style="text-align:left;" | Total
| 216,876
| 100%
|-
| colspan="5" style="background-color:#E9E9E9;"|
|- style="font-weight:bold"
| colspan="4" |Source:
|
|}

1995

|-
! colspan=2 style="background-color:#E9E9E9;text-align:left;vertical-align:top;" |Candidate
! style="background-color:#E9E9E9;text-align:left;vertical-align:top;" |Party
! style="background-color:#E9E9E9;text-align:right;" |Votes
! style="background-color:#E9E9E9;text-align:right;" |%
|-
|style="background-color:"|
|align=left|Andrey Makarov (incumbent)
|align=left|Independent
|53,803
|18.13%
|-
|style="background-color:#3A46CE"|
|align=left|Arkady Murashyov
|align=left|Democratic Choice of Russia – United Democrats
|52,286
|17.62%
|-
|style="background-color:"|
|align=left|Viktor Zhiltsov
|align=left|Communist Party
|36,597
|12.33%
|-
|style="background-color:"|
|align=left|Aleksandr Chumakov
|align=left|Yabloko
|31,530
|10.62%
|-
|style="background-color:"|
|align=left|Fyodor Zheleznov
|align=left|Independent
|20,307
|6.84%
|-
|style="background-color:#FE4801"|
|align=left|Sergey Nefyodov
|align=left|Pamfilova–Gurov–Lysenko
|11,537
|3.89%
|-
|style="background-color:#FF4400"|
|align=left|Vitaly Tarlavsky
|align=left|Party of Workers' Self-Government
|8,746
|2.95%
|-
|style="background-color:"|
|align=left|Vladimir Bespalov
|align=left|Serving Russia!
|8,627
|2.91%
|-
|style="background-color:#DD137B"|
|align=left|Vyacheslav Makarov
|align=left|Social Democrats
|7,067
|2.38%
|-
|style="background-color:"|
|align=left|Anatoly Malashkin
|align=left|Independent
|4,308
|1.45%
|-
|style="background-color:"|
|align=left|Sergey Baranov
|align=left|Independent
|4,291
|1.45%
|-
|style="background-color:"|
|align=left|Vyacheslav Grigoryev
|align=left|Independent
|3,894
|1.31%
|-
|style="background-color:#FF8201"|
|align=left|Aleksandr Semchenko
|align=left|Christian-Democratic Union - Christians of Russia
|3,835
|1.29%
|-
|style="background-color:#000000"|
|colspan=2 |against all
|43,306
|14.59%
|-
| colspan="5" style="background-color:#E9E9E9;"|
|- style="font-weight:bold"
| colspan="3" style="text-align:left;" | Total
| 296,790
| 100%
|-
| colspan="5" style="background-color:#E9E9E9;"|
|- style="font-weight:bold"
| colspan="4" |Source:
|
|}

1999

|-
! colspan=2 style="background-color:#E9E9E9;text-align:left;vertical-align:top;" |Candidate
! style="background-color:#E9E9E9;text-align:left;vertical-align:top;" |Party
! style="background-color:#E9E9E9;text-align:right;" |Votes
! style="background-color:#E9E9E9;text-align:right;" |%
|-
|style="background-color:#3B9EDF"|
|align=left|Nikolay Kovalyov
|align=left|Fatherland – All Russia
|105,155
|34.00%
|-
|style="background-color:#FF4400"|
|align=left|Svyatoslav Fyodorov
|align=left|Andrey Nikolayev and Svyatoslav Fyodorov Bloc
|49,449
|15.99%
|-
|style="background-color:#1042A5"|
|align=left|Arkady Murashyov
|align=left|Union of Right Forces
|32,750
|10.59%
|-
|style="background-color:"|
|align=left|Fyodor Zheleznov
|align=left|Independent
|24,090
|7.79%
|-
|style="background-color:"|
|align=left|Kirill Lyats
|align=left|Independent
|9,305
|3.01%
|-
|style="background-color:#084284"|
|align=left|Ksenia Kuleshova
|align=left|Spiritual Heritage
|6,862
|2.22%
|-
|style="background-color:#7C273A"|
|align=left|Pavel Melnikov
|align=left|Movement in Support of the Army
|6,806
|2.20%
|-
|style="background-color:"|
|align=left|Yelena Guseva
|align=left|Independent
|6,603
|2.14%
|-
|style="background-color:#C21022"|
|align=left|Veniamin Dmitrienko
|align=left|Party of Pensioners
|5,579
|1.80%
|-
|style="background-color:#020266"|
|align=left|Sergey Tseluyko
|align=left|Russian Socialist Party
|3,789
|1.23%
|-
|style="background-color:#C62B55"|
|align=left|Aleksandr Bobrovsky
|align=left|Peace, Labour, May
|1,692
|0.55%
|-
|style="background-color:#000000"|
|colspan=2 |against all
|49,025
|15.85%
|-
| colspan="5" style="background-color:#E9E9E9;"|
|- style="font-weight:bold"
| colspan="3" style="text-align:left;" | Total
| 309,241
| 100%
|-
| colspan="5" style="background-color:#E9E9E9;"|
|- style="font-weight:bold"
| colspan="4" |Source:
|
|}

2003

|-
! colspan=2 style="background-color:#E9E9E9;text-align:left;vertical-align:top;" |Candidate
! style="background-color:#E9E9E9;text-align:left;vertical-align:top;" |Party
! style="background-color:#E9E9E9;text-align:right;" |Votes
! style="background-color:#E9E9E9;text-align:right;" |%
|-
|style="background-color:"|
|align=left|Sergey Osadchy
|align=left|United Russia
|121,221
|45.69%
|-
|style="background-color:#1042A5"|
|align=left|Yevgeny Antonenko
|align=left|Union of Right Forces
|27,444
|10.34%
|-
|style="background-color:"|
|align=left|Sergey Nikitin
|align=left|Communist Party
|19,705
|7.43%
|-
|style="background-color:"|
|align=left|Sergey Zuev
|align=left|Independent
|16,715
|6.30%
|-
|style="background-color: #00A1FF"|
|align=left|Sergey Rubakhin
|align=left|Party of Russia's Rebirth-Russian Party of Life
|7,061
|2.66%
|-
|style="background-color:"|
|align=left|Aleksandr Popov
|align=left|Liberal Democratic Party
|6,858
|2.58%
|-
|style="background-color:#164C8C"|
|align=left|Georgy Anisimov
|align=left|United Russian Party Rus'
|4,214
|1.59%
|-
|style="background-color:"|
|align=left|Andrey Kobozev
|align=left|Independent
|2,095
|0.79%
|-
|style="background-color:#000000"|
|colspan=2 |against all
|54,577
|20.57%
|-
| colspan="5" style="background-color:#E9E9E9;"|
|- style="font-weight:bold"
| colspan="3" style="text-align:left;" | Total
| 266,585
| 100%
|-
| colspan="5" style="background-color:#E9E9E9;"|
|- style="font-weight:bold"
| colspan="4" |Source:
|
|}

2016

|-
! colspan=2 style="background-color:#E9E9E9;text-align:left;vertical-align:top;" |Candidate
! style="background-color:#E9E9E9;text-align:left;vertical-align:top;" |Party
! style="background-color:#E9E9E9;text-align:right;" |Votes
! style="background-color:#E9E9E9;text-align:right;" |%
|-
|style="background-color:"|
|align=left|Irina Belykh
|align=left|United Russia
|58,401
|34.32%
|-
|style="background-color:"|
|align=left|Yelena Pavlova
|align=left|Communist Party
|26,890
|15.80%
|-
|style="background-color:"|
|align=left|Mikhail Peskov
|align=left|Yabloko
|17,919
|10.53%
|-
|style="background-color:"|
|align=left|Yulia Timoshina
|align=left|Liberal Democratic Party
|16,781
|9.86%
|-
|style="background-color:"|
|align=left|Aleksey Alekseev
|align=left|A Just Russia
|12,471
|7.33%
|-
|style="background-color:"|
|align=left|Yana Yaroshevskaya
|align=left|Rodina
|7,380
|4.34%
|-
|style="background:"| 
|align=left|Yekaterina Kolosova
|align=left|Patriots of Russia
|6,682
|4.04%
|-
|style="background:;"| 
|align=left|Sergey Korepanov
|align=left|Communists of Russia
|5,460
|3.21%
|-
|style="background:"|
|align=left|Aleksey Shcherbina
|align=left|People's Freedom Party
|4,921
|2.89%
|-
|style="background:"| 
|align=left|Artur Grokhovsky
|align=left|The Greens
|4,435
|2.61%
|-
|style="background:#00A650;"| 
|align=left|Vasily Grebenchenko
|align=left|Civilian Power
|2,512
|1.48%
|-
| colspan="5" style="background-color:#E9E9E9;"|
|- style="font-weight:bold"
| colspan="3" style="text-align:left;" | Total
| 169,988
| 100%
|-
| colspan="5" style="background-color:#E9E9E9;"|
|- style="font-weight:bold"
| colspan="4" |Source:
|
|}

2021

|-
! colspan=2 style="background-color:#E9E9E9;text-align:left;vertical-align:top;" |Candidate
! style="background-color:#E9E9E9;text-align:left;vertical-align:top;" |Party
! style="background-color:#E9E9E9;text-align:right;" |Votes
! style="background-color:#E9E9E9;text-align:right;" |%
|-
|style="background-color: " |
|align=left|Irina Belykh (incumbent)
|align=left|United Russia
|92,008
|36.85%
|-
|style="background-color: " |
|align=left|Ivan Ulyanchenko
|align=left|Communist Party
|52,656
|21.09%
|-
|style="background-color: " |
|align=left|Arkady Pavlinov
|align=left|A Just Russia — For Truth
|18,249
|7.31%
|-
|style="background-color: "|
|align=left|Dmitry Makarenko
|align=left|New People
|16,112
|6,45%
|-
|style="background-color: " |
|align=left|Vyacheslav Milovanov
|align=left|Liberal Democratic Party
|13,382
|5.36%
|-
|style="background-color: " |
|align=left|Ilya Ulyanov
|align=left|Communists of Russia
|12,477
|5.00%
|-
|style="background: ;"| 
|align=left|Mikhail Khazin
|align=left|Rodina
|11,499
|4.61%
|-
|style="background-color: "|
|align=left|Sergey Ulyanov
|align=left|Party of Pensioners
|6,983
|2.80%
|-
|style="background: ;"| 
|align=left|Andrey Pangaev
|align=left|The Greens
|5,987
|2.40%
|-
|style="background-color: " |
|align=left|Sergey Demin
|align=left|Party of Growth
|4,427
|1.77%
|-
|style="background-color: "|
|align=left|Yevgeny Serafontov
|align=left|Russian Party of Freedom and Justice
|4,010
|1.61%
|-
|style="background: ;"| 
|align=left|Stepan Solovyev
|align=left|Green Alternative
|3,699
|1.48%
|-
|style="background: ;"| 
|align=left|Yury Yurchenko
|align=left|Civic Platform
|2,546
|1.02%
|-
| colspan="5" style="background-color:#E9E9E9;"|
|- style="font-weight:bold"
| colspan="3" style="text-align:left;" | Total
| 249,671
| 100%
|-
| colspan="5" style="background-color:#E9E9E9;"|
|- style="font-weight:bold"
| colspan="4" |Source:
|
|}

Notes

Sources
207. Ховринский одномандатный избирательный округ

References

Russian legislative constituencies
Politics of Moscow